

1 
 Periyar EVR Building, 690, Anna Salai, Nandanam, Chennai-600 035
 Tamil Nadu legislative assembly-secretariat complex	
 Fort St. George (India)
 Thalamuthu Natarajan Building
 N V Natarajan Maaligai
 Ezhilagam
 Kuralagam Buildings
 Valluvar Kottam
 Raj Bhavan (Chennai)
 Bharathiyar Illam
 Kamaraj Memorial House
 Government Museum, Chennai
 Cuddalore Government Museum
 Government Museum, Karur
 Government Museum, Pudukkottai
 Government Museum, Tiruchirappalli
 Ripon Building
 Thendral Valaagam, Kumarasamy Raja Salai (Greenways Road)
 Panagal Maaligai
 Anna Centenary Library
 Chepauk Palace
 Connemara Public Library
 Tamil Nadu Police Museum
 NPKRR Maaligai
 CMDA   Towers
 Aavin Illam
 TIIC Building, No.692, Anna Salai, Nandanam Chennai - 600 035
 L.L.A. Buildings, No.735, Anna Salai, Chennai– 600002
 "Balasundaram Buildings". 350, Pantheon Road, Egmore, Chennai – 600 008
 TNPCB Building, 76, Anna Salai, Guindy Chennai 600 032
 Pallavan House, Anna Salai, Chennai - 600 002.
 TNPHC Building, 132, EVR Salai, Kilpauk, Chennai 600 010
 TNHB Shopping Complex,
 CMWSSB Buildings, No 1, Pumping Station Road, Chindatripet, Chennai 600 002
 Poomalai Commercial Complexs..........All Over Tamil Nadu
 M. Singaravelar Maligai, 32, Rajaji Salai, Chennai 600 001
 Thiruvarangam', No.143, PS Kumaraswamy Raja Salai (Greenways Road), Chennai 600 028
 Tufidco Powerfin Tower, 490/3-4, Nandanam, Anna Salai, Nandanam, Chennai - 600035
 "Mahizhampoo", 163/1, P.S. Kumarasamy Raja Salai (Greenways Road) Chennai - 600 028
 DMS Compound, 359, Anna Salai, Chennai 600 006
 DMS Annex Buildings
 DPI Complex, College Road, Chennai-600 006

2

External links
Official website
https://growwithvip.co.in/plots-in-chennai/
http://www.viphousing.co.in/index.php/projects/

Buildings and structures in Chennai
Office buildings in Chennai
Government buildings in India
Properties
Government properties
India government-related lists